The General Directorate of State Airports Authority ( Genel Müdürlüğü) (DHMİ) is the Turkish government authority responsible for the functioning of airports in Turkey and the regulation and monitoring of air traffic in Turkish airspace. It is associated with the Turkish Ministry of Transport and Infrastructure and is a member of ICAO, EUROCONTROL, and ACI.

The organization operates most airports in Turkey, with the notable exceptions being Istanbul Airport, Antalya Airport, İzmir Adnan Menderes Airport, and Milas–Bodrum Airport.

See also 

TAV Airports Holding, a major airport operator in Turkey
 Directorate General of Civil Aviation (Turkey)

References

Government agencies of Turkey
Aviation in Turkey